The Reba carp (Cirrhinus reba) is a species of ray-finned fish in the genus Cirrhinus. This freshwater edible fish is found in large streams, rivers, tanks, lakes, reservoirs. It is native to Bangladesh, India, Nepal, Pakistan.

Footnotes

References 

Cirrhinus
Fish described in 1822
Taxa named by Francis Buchanan-Hamilton